The Kimberley Echo is a Kununurra, Western Australia based community newspaper.

It was founded in 1980 by James O'Kenny (born James Kenny) (died 15 August 2011, in Kununurra) and Brian Cole.

It was a fortnightly paper from 1980 to 1993, and then became weekly in 1993. National Library and Battye Library holdings details show changes in publication.

In 2007, the newspaper was acquired by West Australian Newspaper Holdings. The Australian Competition & Consumer Commission investigated the sale, but did not oppose it.

Notes

External links
Website

Newspapers published in Western Australia
Kununurra, Western Australia
Newspapers established in 1980
1980 establishments in Australia
Weekly newspapers published in Australia